The National Progressive Front (al-Jabha al-Waṭaniyyah al-Taqaddumiyyah, NPF) is a political alliance of parties in Syria that supports the Arab nationalist orientation of the government and accepts the "leading role" of the Arab Socialist Ba’ath Party, the largest party in the NPF.

History
The Front was established in 1972 by Syrian president Hafez al-Assad to provide for a limited degree of participation in government by political parties other than the ruling Ba'ath Party. Its constitution provides that the Ba'ath Party controls 50% plus one of the votes on its executive committee. A number of seats in the People's Council of Syria are reserved for members of NPF parties other than the Ba'ath Party.  These minor parties are legally required to accept the leadership of the Ba'ath Party. The non-Ba'athist parties in the Progressive Front, for example, are not allowed to canvass for supporters in the army or the student body which are "reserved exclusively for the Ba'ath."

From 1972 to 2011, only parties participating in the NPF had been legally permitted to operate in Syria. The Legislative Decree on Parties law of 2011, Legislative Decree on General Elections Law of 2011 and the new Syrian constitution of 2012 introduced multi-party system in Syria.

After previously being a part of NPF, Syrian Social Nationalist Party joined the opposition, Popular Front for Change and Liberation, for the May 2012 election to the parliament. However, the SSNP supported the re-election of Bashar al-Assad in the June 2014 presidential election and subsequently rejoined the front.

Constituent parties
The NPF is currently composed of the following political parties:

Electoral history

Syrian People's Assembly elections

See also 

National Progressive Front (Iraq)

References

External links

1972 establishments in Syria
Arab nationalism in Syria
Arab socialist political parties
Organization of the Ba'ath Party
Organizations of the Syrian civil war
Parties of one-party systems
Political parties established in 1972
Political party alliances in Syria
Popular fronts
Socialist parties in Syria
Left-wing nationalist parties